This is a list of cities in Japan sorted by prefecture and within prefecture by founding date. The list is also sortable by population, area, density and foundation date. Most large cities in Japan are cities designated by government ordinance. Some regionally important cities are designated as core cities. Tokyo is not included on this list, as the City of Tokyo ceased to exist on July 1, 1943. Tokyo now exists as a special metropolis prefecture (都 to), with 23 special wards (with the same status of city) making up the former boundaries of the former city in the eastern half of the prefecture.

Cities

Dissolved cities

Source data

 The area figures are according to Geographical Survey Institute of Japan as of 2007-10-01.
 The source websites of each prefectures' populations are according to :ja:Template:自治体人口/doc.

See also
 Japanese cities by population (1889)
 Municipalities of Japan
 List of city nicknames in Japan
 List of metropolitan areas in Japan by population
 List of towns in Japan
 List of villages in Japan

References